Wolfgang Schwenke (22 March 1921, Roßlau -3 May 2006, Fürstenfeldbruck) was a German zoologist and entomologist.

Works
Partial List

Vergleichend-biocoenologische Untersuchungen im Waldgebiet des südwestlichen Flämings und seines Elbe-Vorlandes. Ein Beitrag zum Problem der Abgrenzung biocoenologischer Einheiten. (Dissertation.), Leipzig 1950
Über die Standortabhängigkeit des Massenwechsels der Lärchenminiermotte (Colephora laricella Hb.) und der Ahorneule (Acronycta aceris L.) ... etc. . (Habilitationsschrift.), Berlin 1958
Zwischen Gift und Hunger. Schädlingsbekämpfung gestern, heute und morgen, Berlin, Heidelberg und New York 1968
With Peggy Pickering and Mervin W .Larson: Insektenstaaten. Aus dem Leben der Wespen, Bienen, Ameisen und Termiten (OT: Lives of social insects), Hamburg und Berlin 1971
With Stanley Baron: Die achte Plage. Die Wüstenheuschrecke, der Welt größter Schädling (OT: The desert locust), Hamburg, und Berlin 1975
Leitfaden der Forstzoologie und des Forstschutzes gegen Tiere, Hamburg 1981
 Revision der europäischen Mesochorinae (Hymenoptera, Ichneumonoidea, Ichneumonidae), München 1999

and (1972–1986)
Die Forstschädlinge Europas. Ein Handbuch in 5 Bänden
Band 1: Würmer, Schnecken, Spinnentiere, Tausendfüßer und hemimetabole Insekten, Hamburg und Berlin 1972
Band 2: Käfer, Hamburg und Berlin 1974
Band 3: Schmetterlinge, Hamburg und Berlin 1978
Band 4: Hautflügler und Zweiflügler, Hamburg 1982
Band 5: Wirbeltiere, Hamburg 1986
Zeitschrift für Angewandte Entomologie Anzeiger für Schädlingskunde

References
"Wolfgang Schwenke." In: Kürschners Deutscher Gelehrten-Kalender 2003. 19. ed. Vol III. K. G. Saur, Munich 2003.

External links
 Deutschen Nationalbibliothek

1921 births
2006 deaths
People from Dessau-Roßlau
20th-century German zoologists
German lepidopterists